The Japan Women's Open Tennis is a professional women's tennis tournament played on outdoor hard courts. The event is affiliated with the Women's Tennis Association (WTA), and is an International-level tournament on the WTA Tour. As successor to the Japan Open (where men and women played simultaneously, up to 2008) the event was held in women-only form for the first time in 2009, and was the second tournament of the season held in Japan: the Pan Pacific Open, a Premier Five tournament, was held two weeks before. In 2015, the event was moved from Osaka to Tokyo and in 2018 to Hiroshima, before returning to Osaka in 2022.

Past finals

Singles

Doubles

See also
 Japan Open
 Pan Pacific Open

References

 
WTA Tour
Hard court tennis tournaments
Tennis tournaments in Japan
Sports competitions in Osaka
Sports competitions in Tokyo
Recurring sporting events established in 2009
2009 establishments in Japan